Frank Pemberton (14 September 1914 – 26 March 1971) was an English stage and television actor, who after appearing in numerous series and telemovie's, got his big break,  when he became best known as an original cast member of TV series Coronation Street as patriarch Frank Barlow.

Biography
Pemberton was born in Stretford, Lancashire, England in September 1914. He initially studied engineering at the Birmingham Technical College and afterwards joined his father's business as a sales rep. Amateur dramatics in his then home town of Marston Green led him into the theatre and a season with the Southampton Repertory Company. At the outbreak of war, Pemberton was directed into an engineering position, in his spare time teaming up with Mervyn R Pinfield and others to stage plays for the forces. He was later posted to the Royal Navy where he managed to find time to tour most of the Scottish bases with a Naval theatre company.

Demobilisation was followed by the next step to a professional acting career with the formation in 1946 of the performance company “The Star Players”, in partnership with Ernest Pickering and Mervyn R Pinfield (as general manager). Having played a six-week season at Birkenhead YMCA the move was made to Falkirk to join the Falkirk Repertory Company in an arrangement with Aurora Productions Limited. The end of October saw Aurora Production's last performance in Falkirk and a move to The Little Theatre, Great Yarmouth, with Mervyn R Pinfield again general manager. In April 1948 both he and Mervyn R Pinfield left Aurora Productions to join the Morecambe Repertory Theatre Ltd, at the Royalty Theatre. By 1949, he was touring with the Lawrence Williamson Players, and after that joined the Charles Denville Repertory Players on Guernsey.

By April 1957, Frank Pemberton was working on TV with the BBC and ITV. By 1960 he had made more than 100 TV performances and had made the step to Coronation Street as Frank Barlow.

Following his departure from Coronation Street in May 1964, he and other ex-members of the cast joined John Finch and Vince Powell's production of the farce “Firm Foundations” at the Royal Court, Liverpool.

Illness and death
Pemberton suffered a stroke on 24 February 1965 from which he recovered but which severely compromised his acting career. He died prematurely aged 56, in Copthorne, West Sussex of a fatal stroke on 26 March 1971, approximately six weeks after his last appearance as Frank Barlow.

Filmography (selected)

Principal role

References

External links

1914 births
1971 deaths
People from Stretford
Male actors from Manchester
English male stage actors
English male soap opera actors
20th-century English male actors
Royal Navy personnel of World War II